Dental nurse may refer to:

 The role of dental auxiliary or dental assistant (often in a colloquial meaning)
 Registered Dental Nurse, a type of medical worker in the United Kingdom